Stina Segerström (born 17 June 1982) is a Swedish football defender who last played for Kopparbergs/Göteborg FC and the Swedish national team. She was voted rookie of the year (Sweden) in 2006. She has captained KIF Örebro DFF and Kopparbergs/Göteborg FC.

Early life
Segerström spent her early years being raised in Vintrosa. As a youth, she spent two years in Pakistan when her family moved there as aid workers for Save the Children. Upon her family's return to Sweden, they moved to Örebro and Segerström began playing football with Örebro SK at age 11.

Playing career

Club

Kopparbergs/Göteborg FC
Since 2009, Segerström has played for Kopparbergs/Göteborg FC in the Damallsvenskan, the highest division of football in Sweden. During her first season with the team, she started in all 20 matches in which she appeared. Göteborg finished fourth during regular season play with a 14–3–5 record.

Segerström returned for the 2010 season and helped Göteborg finish second during regular season play with a 14–6–2 record as a starting defender for the squad. She played every minute of the season.

Segerström made only three appearances for Göteborg during the 2011 season due to a torn Achilles tendon that she suffered during a match against Umeå IK. Göteborg finished second during regular season play with a 15–3–4 record.

In 2012, Segerström started in all 19 of her appearances for the club  She helped the team clinch the 2012 Svenska Cupen playing every minute of the tournament.  Göteborg defeated Tyresö FF 2–1 in overtime during the final. She returned in April 2013 and helped Göteborg defeat 2012 Damallsvenskan champions Tyresö to clinch the Svenska Supercupen playing defense every minute of the match.

Segerström sat out the 2014 season due to the birth of her son Charlie. In November 2014 she was appointed assistant coach of Elitettan minnows Kungsbacka DFF, with Johanna Almgren as her boss.

International
Segerström made her debut for the Sweden women's national football team on 2 March 2006 during a friendly match against England.

Segerström was named as an alternate for the Sweden squad at the 2012 London Olympics. She had missed the 2011 FIFA Women's World Cup with a torn achilles tendon.

Honors and awards

Individual
 Fair Play Prize, 2006

Team
 Winner, Svenska Cupen Women, 2011–12
 Winner, Super Cup Women, 2013

References

External links
 
 Kopparbergs/Göteborg FC player profile
 
 

1982 births
Swedish women's footballers
Footballers at the 2008 Summer Olympics
Olympic footballers of Sweden
Living people
Sweden women's international footballers
BK Häcken FF players
Damallsvenskan players
KIF Örebro DFF players
Women's association football central defenders
2007 FIFA Women's World Cup players
People from Örebro Municipality
Sportspeople from Örebro County